Lee Hee-beom (March 23, 1949) is a South Korean politician. He took over as President of the Pyeongchang Organizing Committee for the 2018 Winter Olympics to succeed Cho Yang-ho after his resignation.

Early life
Lee Hee-beom was born on March 23, 1949 in Andong, North Gyeongsang Province.

Education
Lee graduated from Seoul National University High School,
Seoul National University, BS
Seoul National University Graduate School of Public Administration, 
George Washington University Master of Business Administration, 
Kyunghee University, Graduate School, Doctor of Business Administration
Hoseo University Honorary Doctorate.

Sports career
On May 4, 2016, he was nominated as President & CEO of the Pyeongchang Organizing Committee for XXIII Olympic Winter Games to replace Cho Yang-ho since stepping down on May 3.

In 2018, he was given the gold Olympic Order award and the Paralympic Order award after his efforts in coordinating the 2018 Winter Olympics and Paralympics in Pyeongchang.

References

External links
https://www.pyeongchang2018.com/en/organizing-committee-president-ceo
https://www.pyeongchang2018.com/en/press-releases/PyeongChang-2018-Executive-Board-Nominates-LEE-Heebeom-as-New-President
http://m.koreatimes.co.kr/phone/news/view.jsp?req_newsidx=208322

Government ministers of South Korea
Presidents of the Organising Committees for the Olympic Games
1949 births
Recipients of the Olympic Order
Recipients of the Paralympic Order
Living people